Eudoxus of Cyzicus (Eúdoxos ho Kyzikēnós; fl. c. 130 BC) was a Greek navigator who explored the Arabian Sea for Ptolemy VIII, king of the Hellenistic Ptolemaic dynasty in Egypt.

Voyages to India

According to Poseidonius, later reported in Strabo's Geography, the monsoon wind system of the Indian Ocean was first sailed by Eudoxus of Cyzicus in 118 or 116 BC. Poseidonius said a shipwrecked sailor from India had been rescued in the Red Sea and taken to Ptolemy VIII in Alexandria. The unnamed Indian offered to guide Greek navigators to India. Ptolemy appointed Eudoxus of Cyzicus, who made two voyages from Egypt to India. The first, in 118 BC, was guided by the Indian sailor. After Eudoxus returned with a cargo of aromatics and precious stones a second voyage was undertaken in 116 BC. Eudoxus navigated the second voyage, sailing without a guide.

Strabo, whose Geography is the main surviving source of the story, was skeptical about its truth. Modern scholarship tends to consider it relatively credible. During the 2nd century BC Greek and Indian ships met to trade at Arabian ports such as Aden (called Eudaemon by the Greeks). Attempts to sail beyond Aden were rare, discouraged, and involved a long and laborious coast-hugging journey. Navigators had long been aware of the monsoon winds. Indian ships used them to sail to Arabia, but no Greek ship had yet done so. For the Greeks to acquire the expertise of an Indian pilot meant the chance to bypass the Arabian ports and establish direct commercial links with India. Whether or not the story told by Poseidonius of a shipwrecked Indian pilot teaching Eudoxus about the monsoon winds is true, Greek ships were in fact soon using the monsoon winds to sail to India. By 50 BC there was a marked increase in the number of Greek and Roman ships sailing the Red Sea to the Indian Ocean.

Another Greek navigator, Hippalus, is sometimes credited with having introduced Europe to the concept of monsoon wind route to India. He is sometimes conjectured to have been part of Eudoxus's expeditions.

African circumnavigation attempts
When Eudoxus was returning from his second voyage to India the wind forced him south of the Gulf of Aden and down the coast of Africa for some distance. Somewhere along the coast of East Africa, he found the remains of a ship. Due to its appearance and the story told by the natives, Eudoxus concluded that the ship was from Gades (today's Cádiz in Spain) and had sailed south around Africa. This inspired him to attempt a circumnavigation of Africa. Organizing the expedition on his own account he set sail from Gades and began to work down the African coast. The difficulties were too great, however, and he was obliged to return to Egypt.

After this failure he again set out to circumnavigate Africa. His eventual fate is unknown. Although some, such as Pliny, claimed that Eudoxus did achieve his goal, the most probable conclusion is that he perished on the journey.

In popular culture
Eudoxus (under the Greek spelling of his name, Eudoxos) is the narrator of L. Sprague de Camp's historical novel The Golden Wind.

See also
List of people who disappeared mysteriously at sea

References

2nd-century BC Greek people
Ancient Greek explorers
Ancient Greeks in Africa
Explorers of Africa
Explorers of Asia
Explorers of India
Explorers of the Indian Ocean
History of Kerala
Lost explorers
Missing person cases in Africa
People lost at sea
People of the Ptolemaic Kingdom